Kevin Handlan is a retired American soccer defender who played professionally in the North American Soccer League and Major Indoor Soccer League. He currently works for the McInnis Group.

Youth
In 1973, Handlan graduated from Kirkwood High School where he was a four-year varsity soccer player.  He is a member of the Kirkwood School District Athletic Hall of Fame.  He attended St. Louis University, playing on the men's soccer team from 1973 to 1976.  In 1973, the team won the NCAA Men's Division I Soccer Championship. In 1975, Handlan played for the St. Louis Kutis team which went to the semifinals of the National Challenge Cup.

Professional
In 1978, Handlan played two games each for both the Tulsa Roughnecks and the San Jose Earthquakes of the North American Soccer League.  He moved to the Los Angeles Skyhawks of the American Soccer League for the 1979 season.  In the fall of 1979, Handlan signed with the St. Louis Steamers of the Major Indoor Soccer League.  He played one season with the Steamers, one with the Chicago Horizon and four with the Kansas City Comets.

References

External links
NASL/MISL stats

American soccer players
American Soccer League (1933–1983) players
Chicago Horizons players
Kansas City Comets (original MISL) players
Los Angeles Skyhawks players
Major Indoor Soccer League (1978–1992) players
North American Soccer League (1968–1984) players
San Jose Earthquakes (1974–1988) players
St. Louis Kutis players
St. Louis Steamers (original MISL) players
Saint Louis University alumni
Saint Louis Billikens men's soccer players
Soccer players from St. Louis
Tulsa Roughnecks (1978–1984) players
1955 births
Living people
Association football defenders
Association football midfielders